The Badzhui (Bajuwi) are a subgroup of the Suhgni group of Pamiris, although sometimes considered to be a distinct ethnographic group. They are primarily Sunni Muslim, unlike the Shughni who are Ismaili. The Badzhui are also known under the generic term Pamir people. They live in the Rushon District of the Gorno-Badakhshan Autonomous Region, Tajikistan.

See also
Pamiri people
Pamir languages

References

Ethnic groups in Tajikistan
Ethnic groups in China